Eric Mbirizi (born 20 April 1998) is a Burundian international footballer who plays as a midfielder or forward for Burundi Premier League side Bujumbura City and the Burundi national football team.

International career
Mbirizi was first called up to the Burundi senior squad in 2016 in preparation for the 2016 CECAFA Cup. After the competition was cancelled, he was called up once more in January 2017, but would have to wait until March to make his debut, which came in a 1–0 friendly win over Djibouti.

International statistics

References

External links
 Eric Mbizi at CAF

1998 births
Living people
Burundian footballers
Burundi international footballers
Association football midfielders
Association football forwards
Atlético Olympic FC players